Một phút để chiến thắng (Vietnamese for "one minute to win") is a Vietnamese weekly prime time game show on HTV7 based upon Minute to Win It of NBC. Contestants take part in a series of 60-second challenges that use objects that are commonly available around the house. The ultimate winner would receive 1 billion đồng in cash (about US$44,500), which is the biggest prize in a Vietnamese game show until 2019.

The show is hosted by Nguyên Vũ. The premiere date was originally set on May 20, 2012, airing at 9:30 p.m. (UTC+7) every Sunday, but it was delayed as the official website announced on that day. Later, the official Facebook page announced the new premiere date would be May 27, 2012.

Since July 27, 2012, the show's time slot was changed to 8:35 p.m. (UTC+7) every Friday. From October 5, 2012, it was changed to 9 p.m. (UTC+7) every Friday.

After broadcasting 26 episodes, rerun of the series began on November 23, 2012, and ended on July 19, 2013. The series also reruns Sundays at 7:30 p.m. (UTC+7) on HTV3 since July 7, 2013.

References

External links 
The official site
Một phút để chiến thắng on Facebook page
The official Youtube channel
List of television programmes broadcast by HTV 

Minute to Win It
Vietnamese television series
Ho Chi Minh City Television original programming
2010s game shows
2010s Vietnamese television series
2012 Vietnamese television series debuts
2012 Vietnamese television series endings
Vietnamese television series based on American television series